Robert Henry Kennedy (June 29, 1921 – July 29, 2010) was a professional American football player who played running back for five seasons for the New York Yankees of the All-America Football Conference (AAFC) and the New York Yanks of the National Football League (NFL).

Football career
After graduation from Sandpoint High School in northern Idaho, Kennedy attended Washington State College in Pullman and played college football for the  he was an All-American fullback and  quarterback. He continued to play football for the U.S. Army Air Forces during the years of World War II, with the Third Air Force Gremlins.

Although selected by the Philadelphia Eagles in the 1943 NFL Draft, after the war Kennedy signed a contract to play for the upstart New York Yankees of the AAFC, a new professional league established in competition with the established NFL. Kennedy played "both ways" for the Yankees, starting as a running back on offense and a linebacker and defensive back 

In , following the merger of the AAFC and the NFL, Kennedy played one season for the short-lived New York Yanks of the NFL.

After football
During his later years, Kennedy worked as a real estate broker and a property developer in southern California; he was a proficient chef and an aficionado of playing cards.

He was inducted into the WSU athletic hall of fame

References

External links
Washington State University Athletics Hall of Fame – Bob Kennedy

1921 births
2010 deaths
American football running backs
American football defensive backs
New York Yankees (AAFC) players
New York Yanks players
Third Air Force Gremlins football players
Washington State Cougars football players
People from Sandpoint, Idaho
Players of American football from Idaho
United States Army Air Forces personnel of World War II